The thirteenth-generation Ford F-Series is a range of pickup trucks produced by Ford. Introduced for the 2015 model year, this generation of the F-Series is the first aluminum-intensive vehicle produced on a large scale by an American vehicle manufacturer.  For the 2017 model year, the fourth-generation Super Duty line adopted the cab design of the F-150, consolidating the cab design for the first time on Ford light-duty trucks (F-550 and below) for the first time since the 1996 model year; the Super Duty trucks still retain separate bodywork and a higher-GVWR frame.

After a two-year hiatus, a second generation of the Ford Raptor made its return for 2017 as a high-performance variant of the F-150, dropping the SVT prefix). In Mexico, the F-Series XL trim is marketed as the F-150, XLT and higher trims are named Lobo (Wolf in Spanish).  The Mexican-market Lincoln Mark LT was discontinued completely, replaced by the Limited and Platinum trims sold elsewhere.

The thirteenth-generation F-Series is produced by Ford in Claycomo, Missouri (Kansas City Assembly) alongside the Ford Transit van and at Dearborn, Michigan (Dearborn Truck Plant).

Design overview 

The thirteenth-generation F-Series was unveiled at the 2014 North American International Auto Show on January 13, 2014.  A number of safety technologies and driver assistance features were introduced as options, including: 360° camera, adaptive cruise control, collision warning with brake support, blind spot information system (BLIS) with cross-traffic alert, and a lane-keeping system.

While not the first aluminum-bodied vehicle developed by Ford (the company developed 40 aluminum-bodied Mercury Sable prototypes in 1993, reducing curb weight by 400 pounds), the F-Series was the first Ford aluminum-bodied vehicle to make it to production.  While changing the metal composition of the best-selling vehicle in the United States, 85% of the parts of the vehicle were domestically-sourced (as of 2016).

When the F-150 was equipped with the optional 2.7L EcoBoost V6 engine and two-wheel drive, it was able to comply with proposed future CAFE standards through 2024 without any modifications.

Chassis 
While nearly all body panels of the F-150 were converted from steel to aluminum construction (the only significant sheetmetal component constructed of steel is the firewall), the frame remained of steel construction, and the use of high-strength steel in the frame was increased from 23% to 77%.  The aluminum body panels resulted in a nearly 750lb reduction in curb weight.  To showcase the durability of the aluminum-intensive design, Ford entered prototypes of the model disguised as 12th generation F150s in the Baja 1000.

Powertrain 
The F-Series underwent a revision of its powertrain offerings, largely to expand its range of both powerful and fuel-efficient engines.  As the entry-level V6, a 3.5 L Ti-VCT V6 replaced the previous 3.7 L V6; though lower in output, the redesign offered a better power-to-weight ratio.  The 3.5 L EcoBoost made its return, joined by the 5.0 L flex-fuel V8; as the Raptor had gone on hiatus, the 6.2 L V8 became exclusive to Super Duty trucks.  Slotted between the two 3.5 L V6 engines, a 2.7 L EcoBoost V6 was introduced; unrelated to the larger EcoBoost engine, it is shared with the Ford Fusion and Lincoln Continental.

For model year 2017, the 3.5 L EcoBoost engine underwent a redesign, increasing its output to 375 hp (450 hp for the Raptor); along with adding supplementary port fuel injection, the engine introduced auto start/stop capability.  For model year 2018, the model line received three all-new engines, as a 3.3 L V6 replaced the naturally-aspirated 3.5 L V6 and the 2.7 L EcoBoost V6 was redesigned (adopting many of the changes from the 3.5 L EcoBoost engine).  For the first time, a diesel engine was offered in the F-150, as a 250 hp 3.0 L PowerStroke V6 was introduced during the model year, dependent on trim (commercial and fleet sales only, for XL and XLT trim).  For 2019, the 450 hp version of the 3.5 L engine was introduced to the flagship Limited trim.

As with the previous generation, the F-Series is offered solely with automatic transmissions.  At initial launch, a 6-speed Ford 6R80 automatic was paired with all four engines.  As part of the introduction of the 2017 Raptor, a 10-speed Ford 10R80 automatic (the first 10-speed transmission in a non-commercial vehicle) was paired to its 3.5 L EcoBoost V6.  For model year 2018, the 10-speed automatic was paired to both EcoBoost engines, the Powerstroke diesel, and the 5.0 L V8 (with only the 3.3 L V6 paired to the 6-speed automatic).

Body 
In line with its predecessor, the thirteenth-generation F-150 is sold with three cab configurations (two-door standard cab, 2+2 door SuperCab, four-door SuperCrew), with rear-wheel drive or four-wheel drive (4×4).  Three bed lengths are available (dependent on cab configuration):  (SuperCrew, all Raptors),  (all except Raptor),  (regular cab, SuperCab).

The 2015 F-150 marked several design departures from previous F-Series model lines.  While the cab design saw largely evolutionary styling changes, the rectangular grille adopted a trapezoidal shape, flanked by C-shaped headlamp units.  Using LED headlights for the first time, designers used polycarbonate thermoplastic optics to focus the beams, with one LED for each beam and an orange thermoplastic light pipe (doubling as the turn signal).  Coupled with the headlamps, the taillamps adopted LED technology, also housing the blind spot monitor; these systems were not typically included on pickup trucks because the system could not be packaged inside steel bumpers typically found on pickup trucks.  The tailgate was redesigned; along with retaining its fold-out step functionality, the tailgate was redesigned, adopting several different styles (dependent on trim).

2018 update 
For 2018, the F-150 underwent a mid-cycle model revision, adopting several design features from the Super Duty model line.  The trapezoidal grille was replaced by an octagonal grille; the three-bar styling was replaced by a wide two-bar configuration (with a larger Ford Blue Oval emblem).  The tailgate saw minor changes, with an embossed "F-150" emblem replacing the previous stamped-metal logo; the taillamps saw a minor revision.  Several appearance packages were introduced for the XL, XLT, and Lariat trims.

To comply with 2018 Federal Motor Vehicle Safety Standards, all 2018 F-150 models received a standard rear-view backup camera.

In comparison to the exterior, the interior of the 2018 F-150 saw fewer visible changes, with most revisions focused on its infotainment systems.  Sync was updated to Sync 3; on select models, the system provides remote access, service information, and other vehicle-related information.  The premium audio system manufacturer shifted from Sony to Bang & Olufsen, with SiriusXM satellite radio becoming standard for the XLT trim.

For 2019, the top-line Limited trim received the powertrain of the Raptor, with a restyled dual exhaust; the Limited also gained a model-specific Camel Back interior color for 2019.

Trim

For the 2015 model year, the F-150 model line underwent several revisions, largely to consolidate the number of trim offerings.  Most visibly, the Raptor was withdrawn (put on hiatus until 2017 to complete its development), with the Tremor and Harley-Davidson special editions discontinued.  The STX, FX2, and FX4 were also discontinued as free-standing trim levels; in a revision, the features of the STX reappeared as a stand-alone option package for 2016, with the suspension features of the FX4 becoming an option package on all 4×4 trims (except the Limited and Raptor).

The thirteenth-generation F-Series follows traditional Ford truck nomenclature with XL, XLT, and Lariat trims; along with the Super Duty line, the F-150 also has premium King Ranch, Platinum, and Limited trims (the Raptor is exclusive to the F-150).

 XL 
 XLT  
 Lariat 
 King Ranch 
 Platinum 
 Limited (MY 2016–2020) 
 Raptor (from 2017)

F-150 Raptor

Following a two-year hiatus, the F-150 Raptor sub-model made its return for the 2017 model year, with the loss of its previous SVT prefix. As with its predecessor, the 2017 Raptor is an off-road oriented vehicle produced in SuperCab and SuperCrew configurations with a model-exclusive 5.5-ft pickup bed. The model continues its lack of a Ford Blue Oval grille badge, with "F-O-R-D" spelled across the center of the grille.

In place of the  6.2 L V8, the new Raptor features a 3.5 L twin-turbo EcoBoost V6 paired with an industry-first 10-speed automatic transmission.

To improve its off-road ability over a standard F-150, the Raptor is fitted with a torque-on-demand transfer case,  travel front and  travel rear Fox Racing suspension, and all-terrain 35" tires and wheels.

For 2019, the Raptor gets a new Trail Control system, optional Recaro sport bucket seats and FOX 3.0 Internal Bypass shock absorbers with Live Valve Technology.

Safety
The 2019 F-150 truck has earned a five-star overall IIHS crash rating.

Recalls
On October 18, 2017 Ford recalled 1.3 million 2015–2017 Ford F-150 and 2017 Ford Super Duty pickups due to door latches that can freeze in cold climates, causing the door to not open or close properly.

On September 6, 2018 Ford recalled approximately 2 million 2015–2018 Ford F-150 Regular Cab and SuperCrew models worldwide because front seatbelt pre-tensioners can generate excessive sparks and possibly cause a fire in the event of a collision.

References

External links

 Official Ford F-150 website

13th generation
Pickup trucks
Motor vehicles manufactured in the United States
Cars introduced in 2014
2020s cars